Garwin can refer to:
 Laura Garwin, Rhodes scholar, science journalist, and trumpeter, daughter of Richard
 Richard Garwin, physicist, father of Laura
 Garwin, Iowa, a town in the United States
 Garwin International, a company in Canada and USA